Hurricane Emmy was the longest-lived hurricane of the 1976 Atlantic hurricane season. The fifth tropical cyclone and the third hurricane of the season, Emmy developed from a tropical wave on August 20 to the east of the Lesser Antilles. Emmy passed through the Azores on September 3, and a day later it was absorbed by approaching Hurricane Frances.

Emmy passed within  of the Lesser Antilles, though only minor effects were experienced. No damage was reported in the Azores, though strong winds from the hurricane caused a Venezuelan air force C-130 flight to crash near Lajes Field, killing all 68 aboard.

Meteorological history 

A tropical wave moved off the coast of Africa between August 15 and August 16. A reconnaissance aircraft flight into the system on August 21 confirmed the existence of a depression, which reported winds of only  with a pressure of 1,012 mbar. The tropical wave from which Emmy developed from continued westward through the Caribbean Sea and ultimately developed into Tropical Storm Joanna in the eastern Pacific Ocean.

The rapid development of an unseasonable frontal low pressure system to the northeast of the storm turned Emmy sharply east-northeastward on August 25. Its eastward movement at such a low latitude for the time of year was unprecedented. After moving eastward for about 24 hours, the Westerlies retreated northward, and Emmy turned gradually to the northwest.

A strong ridge over the north Atlantic Ocean turned Emmy sharply eastward on August 29. On September 1, Emmy turned to the east-southeast, and a day later it turned to the northeast as its forward motion decreased. Emmy passed through the Azores on September 3, and the following day it became extratropical to the north of the islands. The extratropical remnant persisted another six hours before being absorbed by approaching Hurricane Frances.

Impact and preparations 

Initially, the path of Emmy was uncertain whether it would affect the Lesser Antilles. As a result, officials issued a hurricane watch for the northeastern Leeward Islands. The warning was cancelled when the storm turned more to the north, with the outer fringes of the hurricane slightly impacting Antigua. Several ships experienced rough seas and strong winds from Emmy, though none reported any damage. After Emmy turned to the west for the final time, forecasters at the National Hurricane Center considered the hurricane not a real threat to land, though they indicated it had a remote chance to affect land masses. The hurricane also posed a threat to the island of Bermuda initially, though it remained away from the island. Two days before Emmy passed through the Azores, the National Hurricane Center advised citizens there to closely monitor the progress of the storm. No damage reports exist from the Azores, though it was likely not severe.

On September 3, a C-130 Hercules air force flight left Caracas, Venezuela for Spain, with a flight crew of 8 and 60 members of the Central University of Venezuela choir. That night, heavy rainfall from the hurricane forced the plane to land on the Azores island of Terceira Island, Portugal. After attempting twice to land in hurricane-force winds, the plane crashed in a hill one mile from the runway of Lajes Field, killing all 68 aboard.

See also 

 List of Azores hurricanes

References

External links 
 Hurricane Emmy Tropical Cyclone Report
 1976 Monthly Weather Review

Category 2 Atlantic hurricanes
1976 Atlantic hurricane season
Hurricanes in the Azores